Houting station is a station of Line 11, Shenzhen Metro, in China. It opened on 28 June 2016.

References

External links
 Shenzhen Metro Houting Station (Chinese)
 Shenzhen Metro Houting Station (English)

Railway stations in Guangdong
Shenzhen Metro stations
Bao'an District
Railway stations in China opened in 2016